A village green  is an area of common land in a village. 

Village Green may also refer to:

 Village Green, New York, USA
 Village Green, Los Angeles, USA, a neighborhood
 Village Green-Green Ridge, Pennsylvania, USA, a census-designated place
 Village Green, Christchurch, New Zealand, a cricket ground
 "Village Green" (song), by The Kinks

See also
 The Village Green (band), a duo
 The Village Green (EP), self-titled debut EP
 The Village Green (news site), news site for South Orange and Maplewood, New Jersey.